Charles Felix Van Quickenborne (1788–1837) was born in Petegem, near Deinze, Belgium on 21 January 1788. Van Quickenborne is best known as the founder of St. Louis University. He became a Jesuit in Ghent, Belgium in 1815, and, at his request, was sent to the American Missions in 1817. He was appointed Superior and Novice Master of the Jesuit novitiate in White Marsh, Maryland, in 1819.

Westward
In the early 1820s the Bishop of the Louisiana Territory, Louis Du Bourg, invited the Society of Jesus to come to the newly admitted state of Missouri. In 1823, twelve young Belgian Jesuits traveled to Missouri with six African-American slaves: Moses and Nancy, Thomas and Molly, Isaac and Susan, each husband and wife. The Jesuits forced the enslaved couples to leave their children behind; they expected their slaves would produce more children in Missouri.

Saint Louis University
Father van Quickenbourne had opened St. Regis Seminary, a school for young Indian boys, at Florissant, Mo. in May 1824. In late 1824 he wrote to the Superior General of the Jesuits about opening a college in St. Louis on land he had purchased at auction. The beginnings of Saint Louis University as a Jesuit institution may be dated from the period (second half of 1825) at which white students were first received by Father van Quickenborne at St. Regis Seminary.

First recorded Kansas baptism
The following is the first certified baptism:
"A neosho chez Mr. Ligueste Chouteau", (at Neosho in the home of Mr. Ligueste Chouteau), 27 August 1827, Father Van Quickenborne baptized Henri Mongrain, "Son of Noel pere and of Tonpapai, age two years, sponsor Mr. Ligueste P. Chouteau" (baptismal register, St. Ferdinand's church, Florissant, Missouri). Father Van Quickenborne said the first verifiable Mass in Kansas two days earlier at St. Paul in Neosho County.   
In 1837, Father Van Quickenborne baptized 14 Indian children in a Potawatomi camp just outside Fort Leavenworth.

Cathedral of St. Raphael

Death
Father Charles Felix Van Quickenborne died on 17 August 1837 at age 49 and is buried at Florissant, Missouri. 

His missionary work among the Kickapoos was taken over by the Dutch Jesuit Father Christian Hoecken.

References

1788 births
1837 deaths
19th-century Belgian Jesuits
Belgian Roman Catholic missionaries
19th-century American Jesuits
Belgian emigrants to the United States
Saint Louis University people
University and college founders
Roman Catholic missionaries in the United States
Jesuit missionaries
Missionary educators
People of the United Kingdom of the Netherlands